Swetland may refer to:

Jeriah Swetland (1817–?), American businessman and local politician in Ohio
Swetland Publishing Company, founded in 1904 by Horace Monroe Swetland
Swetland Building, in Portland, Oregon, listed on the National Register of Historic Places
Swetland Homestead, Wyoming, Pennsylvania, listed on the National Register of Historic Places
Swetland House, London, Ohio, listed on the National Register of Historic Places
Swetland-Pease House, historic house at East Longmeadow, Massachusetts